Miss Earth 2016, the 16th edition of the Miss Earth pageant, with the theme "Empowered to make a Change", was held on October 29, 2016, at the Mall of Asia Arena, Pasay, Metro Manila, Philippines. 83 contestants from all over the world competed for the title. Angelia Ong of the Philippines crowned her successor Katherine Espín of Ecuador at the end of the event becoming the second Ecuadorian woman to win the title of Miss Earth and the first since Olga Álava in 2011.

This year's edition also features the newly polished and modified crown created by Florida-based jeweler, Ramona Haar. The crown's original design from the 2009 edition of the pageant to enhance the crown's general appearance and to have an intimate fit to the head of the winner. The confirmation was announced by Miss Earth Organization through their official Facebook account on 30 June 2016.

Results

Placements

Notes

Awards
  Winner

Order of announcements

Top 16

Top 8

Top 4

Winning Answer

Telecast Judges
The panel of judges during the pageant finals are:
 Matthias Gelber – green activist from the Philippines
 Arnold Vegafria – President of ALV Talent Circuit and Miss World Philippines Organization executive. from the Philippines
 Jamie Herrell – Miss Earth 2014 from the Philippines.
 Jose Pardo – chairman of the Board of the Philippine Stock Exchange from the Philippines
 Lorraine Schuck – Executive Vice President of Carousel Productions Inc. from the Philippines
 Ronald dela Rosa – Director General of the Philippine National Police. from the Philippines
 Wanda Teo – Secretary of the Department of Tourism of the Philippines.
 Dean Dezius – Fox TV executive.
 Liza Pavlakos – Motivational speaker.
 Sophie Sumner – British fashion model, runner-up of Britain's Next Top Model, Cycle 5, winner of the America's Next Top Model, Cycle 18.

Venue

Coronation Show
On 30 August 2016, Miss Earth announced through their official Facebook page that the 2016 edition of the pageant took place on October 29 at the Mall of Asia Arena – an indoor arena located at the Bay City in Pasay, Metro Manila. This is the 14th time for the Philippines and 11th time for Metro Manila to host the pageant. This year's edition also marks 1st time for MOA Arena to stage the pageant finals.

Official Hotel Residences
 Century Park Hotel, Manila
 Diamond Hotel Philippines
 Oakwood Premier Joy~Nostalg Center, Manila

Pre-Pageant Activities

Medal Tally
To sort this table by delegate, total medal count, or any other column, click on the  icon next to the column title.

Challenge Events

Sponsor Awards

Miss Earth-Hannah's
A special mini-pageant was held on October 8 at Hannah's Beach Resort and Convention Center, Pagudpud, Ilocos Norte. Ten selected candidates competed in evening gown competition, swimsuit competition and question and answer portion. Here are the results:

Miss Earth-Barcelona
A special fashion show was held on October 17 at Barcelona Ruins Park, Barcelona, Sorsogon. 27 selected candidates (Group 1) competed in long gowns made by a Filipino designer. Here are the results:

Delegates
The following are the 83 delegates who competed for the Miss Earth crown:

Notes

Groups

Notes

Debuts

Returns

Last competed in 2012:

Last competed in 2013:

Last competed in 2014:

Withdrawals

Did not compete
 – Mariam Melyan
 – Ines Petrová
 – Brenda Muñoz
 – Lena Bröder
 – Andina Pura
 – Camille Sirot
 – Nazaret Lamarca López

Designations
  – Chantae Chanice Guy was appointed as Miss Earth Belize 2016 by Michael Arnold the franchise holder of Miss Earth in Belize.
  – Bruna Zanardo was appointed as Miss Earth Brazil 2016 by Look Top Beauty Events, the franchise holder of Miss Earth in Brazil.
  - Nera Torlak was appointed as Miss Earth Croatia 2016 by Drago Gavranovic. Torlak was crowned as Miss Earth BiH Fire 2016, giving her the right to represent Croatia.
  – Katherine Elizabeth Espín was appointed as Miss Earth Ecuador 2016 by Diosas Escuela de Misses, the franchise holder of Miss Earth in Ecuador.
  – Suzan Amer was appointed as Miss Earth Iraq 2016 by Iraqi Beauty Pageants, the franchise holder of Miss Earth in Iraq. She finished 2nd runner up at Miss Iraq 2015.
  – Grace Wanene was appointed as Miss Earth Kenya 2016 by Miss Kenya Organization, the organization responsible in sending Kenyan representative to Miss Earth.
  – Begim Almasbeková was crowned as Miss Earth Kyrgyzstan 2016 through her 2nd runner up finish at Miss Kyrgyzstan 2016.
  – Enkhbor Azbileg was appointed as Miss Earth Mongolia 2016 by Miss Mongolia Tourism Association, the Franchise Holder of Miss Earth in Mongolia.
  – Virginia Hernandez was appointed as Miss Earth Panamá 2016 by Justine Pasek and Cesar Anel Rodríguez, the national directors of  Miss Earth  in Panamá.
  – Magdalena Kucharska was appointed as Miss Earth Poland 2016 by Serafina  Makowska of Miss Egzotica, the franchise holder of Miss Earth in Poland.
  –  Svetoisckia Brunswijk was appointed as Miss Earth Suriname 2016 by Tropical Beauties Suriname, the franchise holder of  Miss Earth  in Suriname.
  – Atcharee Buakhiao was crowned as Miss Earth Thailand 2016 through her 1st runner up finish at Miss Universe Thailand 2016 pageant. She also garnered the most number of special awards during the pageant finals.
 – Stephanie de Zorzi  was chosen as Miss Earth Venezuela 2016 at a casting call organized by Alyz Henrich, Miss Earth 2013, the new national director of Miss Earth Venezuela pageant. de Zorzi was Miss Earth Venezuela 2013 but replaced by Maira Alexandra Rodriguez.
  – Nguyễn Thị Lệ Nam Em was appointed as Miss Earth Vietnam 2016 by Helios Media, the National Director of Miss Earth in Vietnam after Miss Vietnam 2014 Nguyễn Cao Kỳ Duyên declined to compete when she was invited. Nam Em was one of the Top 38 of Miss Vietnam 2014, Top 10 of Miss Universe Vietnam 2015 and she crowned Miss Mekong Delta 2015.

Replacements
  – Alexandria Eissinger was replaced by Klaudia Parsberg, the 1st runner-up of Face of Denmark 2015 due to personal reasons.
 – Elsa Técher, the winner of Miss Earth Réunion Island 2016 was replaced by Méli Shèryam Gastrin, Miss Earth Water Réunion 2016 for undisclosed reasons.

International Broadcasters
Worldwide Livestream: Rappler
: Star World
: The Filipino Channel
: Star World
: The Filipino Channel
: Star World
: Canal Uno
: Star World
: The Filipino Channel
: Star World
: Star World
: The Filipino Channel
: Star World
: Star World
: Star World
 Middle East and North Africa: Star World
: Star World
: Star World
: The Filipino Channel
: Star World
: Star World
: ABS-CBN, Star World
: Star World
: Star World
: SCCN Channel 17
: Star World
: Star World
: The Filipino Channel
: Star World

References

External links
 

2016
2016 beauty pageants
Beauty pageants in the Philippines
2016 in the Philippines